Holzinger (or Hölzinger) is a German surname. It may refer to:

People

 Brian Holzinger (born 1972), U.S. ice hockey player
 Helmuth Holzinger (1928–1992), Austrian entomologist
 John Michael Holzinger (1853–1929), German-born American bryologist
 Karl Holzinger (1892–1954), American psychologist
 Juan José Holzinger (?–1864), German colonel in the Mexican Army during the Texas Revolution

Other
 Diureticum-Holzinger, another name for the molecule acetazolamide
 Holzinger class patrol vessel, an offshore patrol vessels class in use by the Mexican Navy

See also
 Holsinger